Jane Maroney El-Dahr is a clinical professor of pediatrics and the head of the division of pediatric allergy and immunology at Tulane University School of Medicine, where she has worked since 1990. She is also the president of the Louisiana Society of Allergy, Asthma and Immunology. She has expertise in allergy, immunology, and rheumatology.

Education
El-Dahr attended Jefferson Medical College, completed both her residency and her fellowship at the University of Virginia Health Science Center, and completed an internship at Yale New Haven Hospital in 1986.

Research
El-Dahr's primary research focus centers on allergies to certain substances in children, such as corn and mold, and is also noted for her research pertaining to post-Hurricane Katrina asthma. However, she is best known for her autism-related research, and has written both chapters 7 and 8 of the book "Understanding Autism for Dummies". She gave a presentation before the Institute of Medicine regarding what she described as the biological plausibility of a thimerosal-autism link in 2001. She has argued that thimerosal causes autism through two separate mechanisms: direct neurotoxicity, and, more indirectly, by causing immune problems. Her research, conducted with James B. Adams and Jeff Bradstreet as coauthors, has concluded that chelation therapy is a safe and effective treatment for autism.

Personal life
El-Dahr has an autistic son, who was 15 years old in 2010. Her father was a general pediatrician, and often made house calls after picking her up from school while she sat in the car and did homework.

References

American immunologists
American pediatricians
Women pediatricians
American women biologists
American biologists
Autism researchers
Thomas Jefferson University alumni
Tulane University faculty
Women medical researchers
American women physicians
Living people
Year of birth missing (living people)
American women academics
21st-century American women